Kepler-67 is a star in the open cluster NGC 6811 in the constellation Cygnus. It has slightly less mass than the Sun and has one confirmed planet, slightly smaller than Neptune, announced in 2013.

Planetary system

References

External links
Kepler-67, The Open Exoplanet Catalogue
Kepler 67, Exoplanet.eu

G-type main-sequence stars
Cygnus (constellation)
2115
Planetary transit variables
Planetary systems with one confirmed planet